"Come Back Suzanne"  is a song by Bill Wyman of the Rolling Stones, released in 1982 as a single from his eponymous third solo studio album, through A&M Records. He described it as "a little bit Stonesy. This one hasn't got any cockney French on it."

Donald Guarisco of AllMusic praised the song as one of the best on the album. He called it "a one-of-a-kind rock/disco/new wave hybrid that blends power chords with ethereal synth flourishes as Wyman delivers a tongue-in-cheek tale of lost love." Susan Molloy of the Sydney Morning Herald considered its lyrics to be among Wyman's best and placed it as an album highlight. Georgiy Starostin called "Come Back Suzanne" a "tongue-in-cheek disco parody (brilliant)."

Personnel
Bill Wyman – lead vocals, bass guitar, all other instruments, design
Terry Taylor – guitar, backing vocals
Dave Mattacks – drums 
Dave Lawson - synthesizer

Charts

Weekly charts

References

External links
 "Come back Suzanne" lyrics

1981 songs
1982 singles
Bill Wyman songs
A&M Records singles
British new wave songs
Song recordings produced by Chris Kimsey
Songs written by Bill Wyman